Kennford is a village situated in the Teignbridge district of Devon, England.

The village became prominent in the 1970s as the location of a new service station on the A38 Devon Expressway between Exeter and Plymouth, near the southern terminus of the then new M5 motorway. This service area is a popular stopping place for tourists on their way to South Devon and Cornwall.

Close to the village is a caravan and camping park.

The entertainer, Danny la Rue, was largely brought up in Kennford (from the age of 6).

References

External links

Villages in Devon